Pseudohypertension, also known as pseudohypertension in the elderly, noncompressibility artery syndrome, and Osler's sign of pseudohypertension is a falsely elevated blood pressure reading obtained through sphygmomanometry due to calcification of blood vessels which cannot be compressed. There is normal blood pressure when it is measured from within the artery. This condition however is associated with significant cardiovascular disease risk.

Because the stiffened arterial walls of arteriosclerosis do not compress with pressure normally, the blood pressure reading is theoretically higher than the true intra-arterial measurement.

To perform the test, one first inflates the blood pressure cuff above systolic pressure to obliterate the radial pulse. One then attempts to palpate the radial artery, a positive test is if it remains palpable as a firm "tube".

It occurs frequently in the elderly irrespective of them being hypertensive, and has moderate to modest intraobserver and interobserver agreement. It is also known as "Osler's maneuver".

The sign is named for William Osler.

References

Symptoms and signs: Vascular
William Osler